Hubert Kirił Urbański (born March 23, 1966, in Warsaw) is a Polish actor, journalist and presenter of Warner Bros. Discovery's TVN of Bulgarian origin.

Urbański studied at Warsaw XIX lyceum of Warsaw Insurgents, and then at the University of Warsaw, where he studied Hindi philosophy. He then began studies at the Aleksander Zelwerowicz State Theatre Academy in Warsaw.

Between 1994 and 1995, Urbański worked at Radio ZET and then at Radio Kolor, where he worked until 1998. He then worked at Radio Tok FM for a year. He began his television career by hosting the Antena at TVP, and Pyramid (Piramida) game show on Polsat. Since 1999, he has been working at TVN, hosting various shows including Dla ciebie wszystko and Taniec z Gwiazdami, the reality shows Jestem Jaki Jestem and Wyprawa Robinson,  and Who Wants to Be a Millionaire.

Urbański is the father of four daughters - Marianna, Krystyna, Stefania and Danuta. His father is Polish and his mother is Bulgarian.

Filmography
 Bar Atlantic (1996) - announcer (voice)
 Miasteczko (2000-2001) - as himself, host of Milionerzy
 Król przedmieścia (2002) - as himself (voice)
 Kasia i Tomek (2002-2003) - tax adviser of Kasia and Tomek
 Vinci (2004) - walk-on person: he is the host of the auction, which is one of the most important scenes in the film (this scene was cut out by the director of the film, although it can be seen on the DVD version).
 Czas Honoru (2011) - as colonel Mieczysław Skotnicki
 Ojciec Mateusz (2015) - as chef Mikołaj Rębacki
 Pierwsza Miłość (2015) - as businessman Damian Skowronek
 Na dobre i na złe (2016) - as Andrzej
 Druga Szansa (2016) - as Hein

Awards
 2000 - a Wiktor award in television discovery of the year category.
 2000 - the award of the ELLE  magazine in discovery of the year.
 2000 - a Telekamery award in the plebiscite of readers (category game shows and games).
 2001 - a Telekamery award in the plebiscite of readers (category game shows and games).
 2006 - 6th place on the most popular stars of Polish show-business list of Forbes magazine.
 2006 - Złote Dzioby award of Radio WAWA in the Event of the Year category.
 2006 - 2nd place with Katarzyna Skrzynecka in Telekamery award's plebiscite in Entertainment category.
 2007 - 3rd place with Katarzyna Skrzynecka in Telekamery award's plebiscite in Entertainment category.

Guest appearances
 On 11 April 2006 he was the guest of Duże dzieci (Big children).
 In October 2006 he was the guest of two episodes of Rozmowy w toku (Talks on-air).
 On 7 May 2007 he was the guest of Szymon Majewski Show (episode 57).
 On 23 December 2007 he was the guest in Kuba Wojewódzki Show.

Advertisements
Since 4 May 2007 Hubert Urbański advertises for Bank Millennium.

References

External links
 Official website of Hubert Urbański 
 

1966 births
Living people
Polish journalists
Polish people of Bulgarian descent
Who Wants to Be a Millionaire?
Aleksander Zelwerowicz National Academy of Dramatic Art in Warsaw alumni
Polish television presenters
People from Warsaw